Arctic Village (Vashrąįį K'ǫǫ  in Gwich'in) is an unincorporated Native American village and a census-designated place (CDP) in Yukon-Koyukuk Census Area, Alaska, United States. As of the 2010 census, the population of the CDP was 152. This was unchanged from 2000. The village is located in the large Gwitch'in speaking region of Alaska, and the local dialect is known as Di'haii Gwitch'in or shahanh. As of 1999, over 95% of the community speaks and understands the language. (Kraus, 1999) As of 2019, the second village chief was against oil drilling because of the impact on caribou

History
Evidence from archaeological investigations indicate that the Arctic Village area may have been settled as early as 4500 BC. Around 500 AD the Athabascan speaking Gwich'in people (often called Neets'aii Gwich'in or "those who dwell to the north") came into the area with seasonal hunting and fishing camps.  About 1900, the village became a permanent settlement.

Geography
Arctic Village is located at  (68.121828, -145.527686), on the
east fork of the Chandalar River, about a hundred miles north of Fort Yukon.  The area consists of flat floodlands near the river, but is mostly wooded hills.

Climate
Arctic Village has a subarctic climate (Köppen Dfc). Summer temperatures are surprisingly mild considering its location North of 68 degrees latitude.

Demographics

Arctic Village first appeared on the 1910 U.S. Census as the unincorporated village of "Arctic." It did not appear on the 1920 census. It returned as "Arctic" from 1930 through 1960. In 1970, it then returned under its present name of Arctic Village. It was made a census-designated place (CDP) in 1980. Curiously, it reported the same population in 1910 and 1930 (40 residents), and in 2000 and 2010 it reported the same population of 152.

As of the census of 2000, there were 152 people, 52 households, and 30 families residing in the CDP. The racial makeup of the CDP was 7.89% White, 86.18% Native American, and 5.92% from two or more races. 0.66% of the population were Hispanic or Latino of any race.

There were 52 households, out of which 44.2% had children under the age of 18 living with them, 25.0% were married couples living together, 21.2% had a female householder with no husband present, and 40.4% were non-families. 32.7% of all households were made up of individuals, and 3.8% had someone living alone who was 65 years of age or older. The average household size was 2.92 and the average family size was 3.58.

In the CDP, the population was spread out, with 41.4% under the age of 18, 9.9% from 18 to 24, 28.9% from 25 to 44, 17.8% from 45 to 64, and 2.0% who were 65 years of age or older. The median age was 24 years. For every 100 females, there were 114.1 males. For every 100 females age 18 and over, there were 128.2 males.

The median income for a household in the CDP was $20,250, and the median income for a family was $19,000. Males had a median income of $21,875 versus $10,000 for females. The per capita income for the CDP was $10,761. About 30.8% of families and 46.3% of the population were below the poverty line, including 53.1% of those under the age of eighteen and none of those 65 or over.

Education
Yukon Flats School District operates the Arctic Village School.

Politics
As of 2019, David Smith Jr. was the second tribal chief of Arctic Village; he opposes oil drilling because of the impact on caribou.

In popular culture

Literature
 J. C. Hutchins' 7th Son, Book 2, Deceit features Arctic Village as a location containing a clue concerning the antagonist's plans.
 Erin Hunter's book Seekers: The Last Wilderness features Arctic Village as a setting in the book. This is where Ujurak is healed by a native and is also captured by a senator.

References

External links

 Arctic Village at the Community Database Online from the Alaska Division of Community and Regional Affairs
 Chandalar River Valley Mountain, north of Arctic Village

Census-designated places in Alaska
Census-designated places in Unorganized Borough, Alaska
Census-designated places in Yukon–Koyukuk Census Area, Alaska
Gwich'in
Populated places of the Arctic United States
Road-inaccessible communities of Alaska